Alagh Prathiban (born 15 September 1989) is an Indian cricketer. He made his first-class debut on 4 February 2020, for Puducherry in the 2019–20 Ranji Trophy.

References

External links
 

1989 births
Living people
Indian cricketers
Pondicherry cricketers
Place of birth missing (living people)